

Lizards

Iguanids (family Iguanidae)

Skinks (family Scincidae)

Alligator lizards (family Anguidae)

Snakes

Colubrids (family Colubridae)

Vipers (family Viperidae)

Boas (family Boidae)

Turtles

Family Emydidae

See also 
 List of fauna of Washington (state)

References 

Washington
Reptiles